Pfeifferia is a genus of air-breathing land snails, terrestrial pulmonate gastropod mollusks in the subfamily Helicostylinae of the family Camaenidae.

Species
 Pfeifferia aurata (G. B. Sowerby I, 1841)
 Pfeifferia erubescens (C. Semper, 1877)
 Pfeifferia lividocincta (C. Semper, 1877)
 Pfeifferia luteocincta (C. Semper, 1877)
 Pfeifferia micans (L. Pfeiffer, 1845)
 Pfeifferia pudibunda (C. Semper, 1877)
 Pfeifferia stevenliei Thach & Abbas, 2021

References

 Bank, R. A. (2017). Classification of the Recent terrestrial Gastropoda of the World. Last update: July 16th, 2017

External links
 Gray, J. E. (1853). Descriptions of two new genera (Pfeifferia and Janella) of land Mollusca. Annals and Magazine of Natural History. (2) 12: 412–417
 Pilsbry, H. A. (1891-1892). Manual of conchology, structural and systematic, with illustrations of the species. Ser. 2, Pulmonata. Vol. 7: Helicidae, vol.5. pp 1-225, pls 1-61. Philadelphia, published by the Conchological Section, Academy of Natural Sciences.
 Mörch, O. A. L. (1865). Quelques mots sur un arrangement des mollusques pulmonés terrestres (Géophiles, Fér.) basé sur le système naturel. Journal de Conchyliologie. 13: 376-396

Camaenidae